A River Runs Through It is a 1992 American drama film directed by Robert Redford and starring Craig Sheffer, Brad Pitt, Tom Skerritt, Brenda Blethyn, and Emily Lloyd. It is based on the 1976 semi-autobiographical novella A River Runs Through It by Norman Maclean, adapted for the screen by Richard Friedenberg. Set in and around Missoula, Montana, the story follows two sons of a Presbyterian minister, one studious and the other rebellious, as they grow up and come of age in the Rocky Mountain region during a span of time from roughly World War I to the early days of the Great Depression, including part of the Prohibition era.

The film won the Academy Award for Best Cinematography and was also nominated for Best Music, Original Score and Best Adapted Screenplay. The film grossed over $66 million and received positive reviews from critics.

Plot

The Maclean brothers, Norman and Paul, grow up in Missoula, Montana, with their mother, Clara, and their father, Rev. John Maclean, a Presbyterian minister, from whom they learn a love of fly fishing for trout in the Blackfoot River. Norman and Paul are home-schooled under the strict moral and academic code of their father. Norman leaves to attend college at Dartmouth. When he returns six years later during the Prohibition era and the Jazz Age, he finds that Paul has become a highly skilled fisherman and a hard-drinking, fearless investigative journalist working for a newspaper in Helena.

Norman attends a Fourth of July dance and meets Jessie Burns, a flapper whose father runs the general store in Wolf Creek. Immediately smitten, Norman calls her the next morning and sets up a double date. Norman and Jessie go on their first date at the Hot Springs speakeasy. Paul arrives with his date, a similarly hard-drinking Cheyenne woman named Mabel, who is treated as an inferior by the local white crowd.

Soon after, Norman is called to bail Paul out of jail after Paul is arrested for hitting a man who insulted Mabel. The desk sergeant tells Norman that Paul has angered local criminals by falling behind in his debts from a big poker game at the Lolo speakeasy. Norman offers to give Paul money, but Paul brushes him off.

After Norman and Jessie go on several dates, she asks him to help her alcoholic brother Neal, who is visiting from Southern California. Norman and Paul dislike Neal, but at Jessie's insistence they invite him to go fly fishing. Neal shows up drunk with Rawhide, a prostitute whom he met the night before. Norman and Paul get separated from Neal but fish anyway and return to their car hours later to find that Neal and Rawhide have drunk all the beer, had sex, and passed out naked.
 
Norman drives an intoxicated Neal home, where Jessie is enraged that the brothers left Neal alone with the beer instead of fishing with him. Norman tells her that he is falling in love with her. Jessie drives away angry but a week later asks Norman to come to the train station to see Neal off. After the train departs, Jessie laments her failure to save Neal from his alcoholism and asks why the people who need help the most will not accept it. Norman shows Jessie a letter from the University of Chicago offering him a faculty position in the Department of English Literature. He tells Jessie that he does not wish to leave Montana and when it becomes clear that it is because of her, she embraces him.

That night, a drunken Norman meets up with Paul and announces his love for Jessie. Paul says they should celebrate but instead takes Norman to the Lolo speakeasy. Paul tries to get in on the poker game in the backroom, but the dealer will not let him play because he already owes so much. Paul tells Norman that he isn't leaving since he is feeling lucky and that he will convince the others to let him play. Norman reluctantly drives off after Paul asks him to go fishing the next day.

Norman is relieved when Paul arrives the following morning,  as he feared for his brother's life. Norman tells his family that he is going to accept the job in Chicago. Norman, Paul, and their father go fly fishing one last time. Norman urges his brother to come with him and Jessie to Chicago, but Paul says he will never leave Montana. He hooks a huge rainbow trout that drags him down the river rapids before he lands it. Their father tells Paul that he has become a wonderful fisherman and an artist in the craft, much to Paul's delight.

Just before Norman is to leave for Chicago, police inform him that Paul was beaten to death. Norman breaks the news to his parents. Years later, Mrs. Maclean, Norman, Jessie, and their two children listen to a sermon given by Rev. Maclean soon before his own death. Rev. Maclean preaches about being unable to help loved ones who are destroying themselves and will not accept help. All that those who truly care for such a self-destructive person can do, Rev. Maclean concludes, is to give unconditional love, even without understanding why.

The closing scene shows an elderly Norman Maclean fishing on the same river as director Robert Redford narrates the final lines from his original novella.

Cast

In addition, Joseph Gordon-Levitt and Van Gravage portray the childhood versions of Norman and Paul, respectively, while director Robert Redford provides the uncredited narration, in the first person voice of a senior Norman.

Production

Filming

Although both the book and movie are set in Missoula and on the Blackfoot River, it was filmed in late June to early July 1991 in south central Montana in Livingston and Bozeman,  and on the nearby upper Yellowstone, Gallatin, and Boulder Rivers. Filming was completed in early September 1991.

An article published in the Helena Independent Record in July 2000, based on recollections of people who knew both brothers, noted a number of specifics about the Macleans — notably various chronological and educational details about Paul Maclean's adult life — that differ somewhat from their portrayal in the film and novella.

Music
Mark Isham, who would go on to compose the scores to most Robert Redford-directed films, composed the musical score for the film. Originally, Elmer Bernstein was hired to score the film. However, after Redford and Bernstein disagreed over the tone of the music, Bernstein was replaced by Isham. Rushed for time, Isham completed the score within four weeks at Schnee Studio of Signet Sound Studios in Hollywood, CA. Upon release, the music was met with positive reviews earning the film nominations for both Grammy and Academy awards. The A River Runs Through It (Original Motion Picture Soundtrack) was released on October 27, 1992.

Release
It premiered at Bozeman, Montana, with a theatrical release on October 9 in the United States.

Home media
A River Runs Through It was originally released on VHS on May 19, 1993. It was released on DVD in 1999 and in a deluxe DVD edition in 2005. It was reissued on Blu-ray in July 2009 by Sony Pictures with six extra features including 17 deleted scenes and a documentary titled Deep Currents: Making 'A River Runs Through It' with interview segments of the cast and crew.

Reception

Box office

Released on October 9, 1992, the film grossed $43,440,294 in the United States and Canada. In 1993, it grossed $22.9 million for a worldwide total of over $66 million.

Critical response
On Rotten Tomatoes the film holds an approval rating of 80% based on 45 reviews, with an average rating of 6.79/10. The site's critics consensus reads: "Tasteful to a fault, this period drama combines a talented cast (including a young Brad Pitt) with some stately, beautifully filmed work from director Robert Redford." On Metacritic, the film has a weighted average score of 68 out of 100, based on 21 critics, indicating "generally favorable reviews". Audiences polled by CinemaScore gave the film an average grade of "A−" on an A+ to F scale.

Roger Ebert of the Chicago Sun-Times gave the film 3.5 out of 4 stars. He wrote “Redford and his writer, Richard Friedenberg, understand that most of the events in any life are accidential or arbitrary, especially the crucial ones, and we can exercise little conscious control over our destinies.”

Much of the praise focused on Pitt's portrayal of Paul, which has been cited as his career-making performance. Despite the critical reception, Pitt was very critical of his performance on the film: "Robert Redford made a quality movie. But I don't think I was skilled enough. I think I could have done better. Maybe it was the pressure of the part, and playing someone who was a real person — and the family was around occasionally — and not wanting to let Redford down."

Accolades

References

External links 

 
 
 
 

1990s American films
1990s English-language films
1992 drama films
1992 films
American biographical films
American coming-of-age films
American independent films
Films about fishing
Films about brothers
Films set in Montana
Films set in the 1910s
Films set in 1912
Films set in the 1920s
Films set in 1924
Films set in 1926
Films set in the 1930s
Films set in 1938
Films set in the 1980s
Films set in 1980
Films shot in Montana
Films based on short fiction
Films whose cinematographer won the Best Cinematography Academy Award
Films directed by Robert Redford
Films scored by Mark Isham
Films about father–son relationships
Fly fishing